Anton Dolhyi (born 26 March 1992) is a Ukrainian football midfielder.

Dolhyi is a product of FC Dynamo Kyiv youth sportive school system and spent some years in the different teams of the Ukrainian First League. In August 2015 he signed a two-year contract with Portuguese club Aves.

References

External links 

1992 births
Living people
Ukrainian footballers
FC Dynamo-2 Kyiv players
Association football midfielders
FC Zirka Kropyvnytskyi players
FC Helios Kharkiv players
Ukrainian expatriate footballers
Expatriate footballers in Portugal
Ukrainian expatriate sportspeople in Portugal
Expatriate footballers in Greece
Ukrainian expatriate sportspeople in Greece
C.D. Aves players
F.C. Tirsense players
Liga Portugal 2 players
Place of birth missing (living people)
SC Chaika Petropavlivska Borshchahivka players
FC Cherkashchyna players
FC Olimpiya Savyntsi players